Polar rose may refer to:

 Rose (mathematics), a mathematical curve
 Polar Rose (facial recognition), a company out of Malmö, Sweden which makes facial recognition software.